The 1954 Dartmouth Indians football team was an American football team that represented Dartmouth College as an independent during the 1954 college football season. In their 12th and final season under head coach Tuss McLaughry, the Indians compiled a 3–6 record, and were outscored 250 to 121. Louis Turner was the team captain.

Dartmouth played its home games at Memorial Field on the college campus in Hanover, New Hampshire.

Schedule

References

Dartmouth
Dartmouth Big Green football seasons
Dartmouth Indians football